James McDougall (born 1974) is a British historian. He is Professor of Modern and Contemporary History at the University of Oxford and Laithwaite Fellow in History at Trinity College, Oxford.

Career
James McDougall studied French, German, and Arabic at the University of St Andrews, then modern Middle Eastern history and politics at St Antony's College, Oxford. He was a junior research fellow at the Middle East Centre of St Antony's College, Oxford (2002–2004), then assistant professor of history at Princeton University (2004–2007) and lecturer in the history of Africa at the School of Oriental and African Studies, University of London (2007–2009), before taking up a tutorial fellowship in modern history at Trinity College, Oxford, in 2009. He was awarded a professorial title in 2018.

McDougall's research focuses on the history of North Africa and the French colonial empire.

In 2015, he supported an academic boycott of Israeli higher education institutions.

McDougall has written for The Guardian and Times Higher Education. In 2018, McDougall was involved in academic disagreement in Oxford with Nigel Biggar's controversial "Ethics and Empire" project.

Selected works 
 Nation, society and culture in North Africa (Routledge, 2003)
 History and the culture of nationalism in Algeria (Cambridge University Press, 2006)
 Saharan frontiers: Space and mobility in northwest Africa with Judith Scheele (Indiana University Press, 2012)
 Global and local in Algeria and Morocco: The world, the state, and the village with Robert P. Parks (Routledge, 2015)
 A History of Algeria (Cambridge University Press, 2017)

References

External links
 McDougall's profile at Trinity College
 McDougall's profile at the University of Oxford Faculty of History

Living people
English historians
Fellows of Trinity College, Oxford
1974 births